Brackeen is a surname. Notable people with the surname include:

 Charles Brackeen (1940–2021), American jazz saxophonist 
 Joanne Brackeen (born 1938), American jazz pianist and music educator

See also
 Haaland v. Brackeen, lawsuit